Pieter Belmer (7 August 1892 – 24 November 1979) was a Dutch weightlifter. He competed in the men's middleweight event at the 1920 Summer Olympics.

References

External links
 

1892 births
1979 deaths
Dutch male weightlifters
Olympic weightlifters of the Netherlands
Weightlifters at the 1920 Summer Olympics
Sportspeople from Amsterdam
20th-century Dutch people